A trihydroxyanthraquinone or trihydroxyanthracenedione is any of several isomeric organic compounds with formula , formally derived from anthraquinone by replacing three hydrogen atoms by hydroxyl groups.  They include several historically important dyes.  The isomers may differ in the parent anthraquinone isomer and/or of the three hydroxyl groups.

In general there are 56 ways of choosing three out of the 8 hydrogens.  However, if the underlying core is symmetrical, some of these choices will give identical molecules.

Isomers

From 9,10-anthraquinone
Due to the symmetry of the 9,10-anthraquinone core, there are only 14 isomers.

1,2,3-Trihydroxyanthraquinone (anthragallol) 
1,2,4-Trihydroxyanthraquinone (purpurin), a component of madder root dye. 
1,2,5-Trihydroxyanthraquinone (oxyanthrarufin) 
1,2,6-Trihydroxyanthraquinone (flavopurpurin) 
1,2,7-Trihydroxyanthraquinone (isopurpurin, anthrapurpurin)
1,2,8-Trihydroxyanthraquinone (oxychrysazin)
1,3,5-Trihydroxyanthraquinone 
1,3,6-Trihydroxyanthraquinone 
1,3,7-Trihydroxyanthraquinone 
1,3,8-Trihydroxyanthraquinone 
1,4,5-Trihydroxyanthraquinone 
1,4,6-Trihydroxyanthraquinone 
1,6,7-Trihydroxyanthraquinone 
2,3,6-Trihydroxyanthraquinone

See also
Hydroxyanthraquinone
Dihydroxyanthraquinone
Tetrahydroxyanthraquinone
Pentahydroxyanthraquinone
Hexahydroxyanthraquinone
Heptahydroxyanthraquinone
Octahydroxyanthraquinone

References